The Adam Mickiewicz Library and Dramatic Circle is a non-profit membership-based organization founded in 1895. It is the oldest Polish American organization in Western New York and is the oldest surviving Polish library in Buffalo. The library holds approximately 12,000 volumes with 400 hand copied plays. The bar serves over 50 different imported beers with a large Polish selection. The "Circle" is home to most of Torn Space Theater's productions and a large annual Dyngus Day party, as well as other cultural events.

See also
Buffalo, New York
East Side, Buffalo
Adam Mickiewicz

External links 

 The Online Voice of Buffalo's Historic Polonia
  Forgotten Buffalo's review of Adam Mickiewicz Library & Dramatic Circle
 Buffalo For Real "Beer" video featuring the Adam Mickiewicz Library and Dramatic Circle 

1895 establishments in New York (state)
Polish-American culture in Buffalo, New York
Libraries in New York (state)
Culture of Buffalo, New York
Adam Mickiewicz